Larkin State Park Trail is a Connecticut rail trail that follows the former New York & New England Railroad roadbed across the towns of Southbury, Oxford, Middlebury, and Naugatuck. The trail is open for hiking, biking, horseback riding, and cross-country skiing.

History
The rail line was in operation from 1881 until 1939. Four years after the line's abandonment, Dr. Charles L. Larkin bought a ten-mile section that he donated to the state for the purpose of creating an equestrian trail. The park was named in his honor.

References

External links
Larkin State Park Trail Connecticut Department of Energy and Environmental Protection
Larkin State Park Trail Map - Eastern Section Connecticut Department of Energy and Environmental Protection
Larkin State Park Trail Map - Western Section Connecticut Department of Energy and Environmental Protection

 
 

Rail trails in Connecticut
State parks of Connecticut
Parks in New Haven County, Connecticut
Southbury, Connecticut
Oxford, Connecticut
Middlebury, Connecticut
Naugatuck, Connecticut
New York and New England Railroad
1943 establishments in Connecticut
Protected areas established in 1943